Ahd Bloc was a joint list of Democratic Front for the Liberation of Palestine, Palestinian Popular Struggle Front, Arab Liberation Front and independents for the May 2005 municipal elections in Bethlehem, the West Bank. In total, the Bloc presented 9 candidates (5 Christians and 4 Muslims). The top candidate of the Bloc was Dr. Peter Qumri, director of Beit Jala Hospital.

References

External links
Candidate List
Election Programme
Bethlehem municipal election blocs
Defunct political party alliances in the Palestinian territories
Democratic Front for the Liberation of Palestine
Organizations associated with the Ba'ath Party